Varney is an unincorporated community in Pike County, Kentucky, United States. Its ZIP Code is 41571; the population of the 41571 ZIP Code Tabulation Area (ZCTA) was 543 at the 2000 census.

Geography
Varney is located at  (37.609843, -82.418289).

According to the United States Census Bureau, the ZCTA has a total area of 14.67 sq mi, all land.

In popular culture
In the 2007 film The Bourne Ultimatum it is revealed that the birth date that Pamela Landey gives to Bourne during a phone conversation, 4/15/71, is not his actual date of birth, and therefore a code. When searching for Bourne, the agents of Operation Blackbriar, which eavesdropped on the call, try to figure out what the code's meaning. One agent discerns that when converted into longitude and latitude coordinates, it indicates a location in Cameroon. Another agent says that 41571 is the ZIP code for Varney, Kentucky. It is eventually determined that the code is an instruction to Bourne directing him to go to 415 East 71st Street in New York City.

References

External links
41571.com - Information about Varney, Kentucky
Varney, Kentucky coordinate information, etc

Unincorporated communities in Kentucky
Unincorporated communities in Pike County, Kentucky